White City (Philadelphia), originally known as Chestnut Hill Park, was an amusement park in Erdenheim, Pennsylvania, just outside Philadelphia and near Chestnut Hill. It was established in 1898 by the Chestnut Hill Casino Company which included stockholders Henry B. Auchy (owner of the Philadelphia Toboggan Company), Clinton Rorer (President), John Roehm Sr. (Treasurer) and John Roehm Jr. (Secretary). Their intent was to provide a park for the middle to working class of Philadelphia and Norristown with a trolley fare of only five cents in comparison to the more expensive 30c fare to Willow Grove Park. It became a White City amusement park in 1906. After years of complaints from local residents, the park shut down in 1912.

Creation
In February 1898, the Chestnut Hill Casino Company purchased 25 acres of land in Springfield Township at the northwest corner of Bethlehem Pike and Paper Mill Road. Within three months, the amusement park was developed and due to open in May but the opening had to be pushed back to June 11 because of heavy rains.

Attractions and Exhibits
At its opening, the park was described by the Philadelphia Inquirer as a "veritable fairyland scene" and boasted 50,000 fragrant plants, toboggan, carousel, a lake with row boats, electric launches, and a live brass band conducted by Professor Kalitz. More amusement rides and other attractions were later built, such as a rollercoaster, pony track, and roller skating rink. Events and entertainment were often hosted, such as athletic meets, vaudeville performances, acrobats and gymnasts or the presentation of a trained baby elephant named Little Hip.

The reconstruction and redecoration in 1906 when it was also renamed White City was well received.

Criticism and Closure
Many upper class residents of the area resented the lower class visitors who frequented the park, claiming it depreciated the desirability and value of the suburb. In February 1912, after the park's most successful year in 1911, several wealthy locals including George C. Thomas Jr., Charles N. Welsh, Wilson Potter, and Jay Cooke III pooled their money, bought the park for about $500,000, and immediately shut it down before the seasonal opening in the spring. After demolishing it, the land remained unused until 1927 when the original Springfield Township High School was built on part of it, which now operates as the Philadelphia-Montgomery Christian Academy. A small pond is all that remains of the park and lake today.

References

Defunct amusement parks in Pennsylvania
Amusement parks in Pennsylvania